James Emanuel Kelso (10 March 1910, Sydney – 23 February 1988, Bondi) was an Australian professional feather/light/welterweight boxer of the 1920s and '30s who won the New South Wales State (Australia) lightweight title, Australian lightweight title, and British Empire lightweight title, his professional fighting weight varied from , i.e. Welterweight.

References

External links

Article - Boxing ~ Jimmy Kelso Retires
Champion Boxer ~ Claim For Damages Against "Jimmy" Kelso

1910 births
1988 deaths
Featherweight boxers
Lightweight boxers
Boxers from Sydney
Welterweight boxers
Australian male boxers
Commonwealth Boxing Council champions